Scum or S.C.U.M. may refer to:

Scum 
 Soap scum, an informal term for the white solid that results from the addition of soap to hard water
 Impurity that accumulates at the surface of a liquid (especially water or molten metal)
 Dross, solid impurities floating on a molten metal
 Algae or similar vegetation found floating on the surfaces of ponds
 The topmost liquid layer in a septic tank, mainly consisting of fats

Games and sport
 Scum (video game), an upcoming open-world survival video game
 Scum (card game), a card game in which players race to get rid of all of the cards in their hands
 S.C.U.M. (professional wrestling), a professional wrestling stable
 "Scum" or "scummers", a derogatory nickname for English football club Southampton F.C., used by supporters of rivals Portsmouth

Books, film and TV
 Scum, novel by Isaac Bashevis Singer translated from the Yiddish by Rosaline Dukalsky Schwartz 
 Scum, a script by Roy Minton
 Scum (television play), a once banned television version (1977) directed by Alan Clark with Ray Winstone in a lead role
 Scum (film), a British feature film version (1979) of the above directed by Clark and with Winstone

Music

Bands
 Scum (band), a Norwegian hardcore punk/black metal band
 S.C.U.M (band), an English post-punk/art rock group
 SCUM, a side project of Japanese noise musician Merzbow

Albums
 Scum (Anti-Nowhere League album), 1997
 Scum (Napalm Death album), 1987
 Scum (Rat Boy album), 2017
 Scums (album), by Nightmare, 2013

Songs
 "Scum", by Depeche Mode from Spirit, 2017
 "Scum", by Goat Girl, 2016
 "Scum", by Meat Puppets from No Joke!, 1995
 "Scum", by Nick Cave and the Bad Seeds from Your Funeral... My Trial, 1986
 "Scum", by Oi Polloi from Unite and Win, 1987

Acronyms
 SCUMM (Script Creation Utility for Maniac Mansion), scripting language for development of the graphical adventure game Maniac Mansion
 SCUM Manifesto, a 1967 radical feminist manifesto wherein SCUM means "Society for Cutting Up Men"
 Project SCUM, a cigarette marketing initiative
 S.C.U.M. ("Saboteurs and Criminals United in Mayhem"), the criminal organisation from the animated series; James Bond Jr.

See also 
 
 Scum Lake (disambiguation)
 Scum of the Earth (disambiguation)
 Skum (disambiguation)
 Scump or Seth Abner (born 1995), professional Call of Duty player
 Scrum (disambiguation)